Valerie Hoffman (aka Valerie Howlett-Hoffman and Valerie Howlett) is an American film and television producer.

Background

According to her official biography on the Canyon Entertainment website, she began her career at a CBS affiliate in Providence, Rhode Island, and received a degree in Business Management from Stonehill College. She moved to Los Angeles, California to begin work in the film industry and started as a production assistant on an independent film before moving to Production Coordinator for many of her next projects, working on both studio and independent projects.

Career

Under her various names, she has worked on numerous films as either a Production Manager, Line Producer, or Film Producer. Her film credits include the Las Vegas portion of Get Carter, the Las Vegas portion of 3000 Miles to Graceland, Jeepers Creepers, Knockout, Nice Guys Sleep Alone, and Say it in Russian. She also co-produced the films The Woodsman, Shadowboxer and Tennessee.

Current

Ben Kingsley announced SBK-Pictures with producing partners Simone Sheffield and Valerie Hoffman as readying six projects and currently producing a film on the Native American Conley Sisters title Whispers Like Thunder, to be released in 2009. Kingsley will be playing the role of Charles Curtis, the first and only Native American to become vice-president of the United States.

Filmography

References

External links

http://www.valeriehoffman.com

American film producers
American television producers
American women television producers
Living people
Year of birth missing (living people)
21st-century American women